Rue Sainte-Anne is a street in the 1st and 2nd arrondissement of Paris.

References

Sainte-Anne
Sainte-Anne